Quittner is a surname. Notable people with the surname include:

 Janos Quittner (born 1941), Slovak dancer, choreographer, and director
 Josh Quittner (born 1957), American journalist
 Zsigmond Quittner (1859–1918), Hungarian architect